Aliabad-e Khaleseh (also Romanized as ‘Alīābād-e Khāleṣeh; also known as ‘Alīābād) is a village in Tarand Rural District, Jalilabad District, Pishva County, Tehran Province, Iran. At the 2006 census, its population was 150, in 29 families.

References 

Populated places in Pishva County